Algie is a surname, given name and nickname. 

Algie may also refer to:

 Algie Glacier, Antarctica
 Algie Knoll, Antarctica
 al-Jiyya, a Palestinian village which is sometimes transliterated as Algie
 Algie, one of the most famous of the Pink Floyd pigs show props

See also
 Algae (disambiguation)